Will Power is a 1913 silent American short comedy film directed by Phillips Smalley and starring Pearl White.

It is preserved in the Library of Congress collection.

Cast
Pearl White - Pearl
Chester Barnett - Chester
Joseph Belmont - Pearl's father

References

External links
 Will Power at IMDb.com

1913 films
Universal Pictures short films
American silent short films
American black-and-white films
Films directed by Phillips Smalley
Silent American comedy films
1913 comedy films
1913 short films
1910s American films